Baradero Partido is a  partido of Buenos Aires Province in Argentina.

The district was founded on July 25, 1615, making it one of the oldest partidos in Buenos Aires Province.

Towns
Baradero
Irineo Portela
Santa Coloma (Baradero)
Villa Alsina

References

External links

 
 City of Baradero
 Federal Website

Partidos of Buenos Aires Province
States and territories established in 1615
1615 establishments in the Spanish Empire